Over 30,000 Korean people live in the Koreatown in Shanghai's Gubei neighborhood, which is where 60% of the Koreans live in Shanghai.

Jingting Seoul Plaza shopping center is a neighborhood landmark on Hongquan Road.

Transportation

The area is accessible by Hechuan Road Station on Line 9 and Longbai Xincun Station on Line 10.

References
 

Koreatowns
Neighbourhoods of Shanghai